Patriarch Meletius of Alexandria may refer to:

 Patriarch Meletius I of Alexandria, ruled in 1590–1601
 Patriarch Meletius II of Alexandria, ruled in 1926–1935